The Producers Guild Film Award for Best Actor in a Leading Role (previously known as the Apsara Award for Best Actor in a Leading Role) is given by the producers of the film and television guild as part of its annual award ceremony for Hindi films, to recognise a male actor who has delivered an outstanding performance in a leading role. Following its inception in 2004, no one was awarded in 2005 and 2007.

† - indicates the performance also won the Filmfare Award
‡ - indicates the performance was also nominated for the Filmfare Award

Superlatives

Winners and nominees

2000s

 2004 Hrithik Roshan – Koi... Mil Gaya as Rohit Mehra †
 Ajay Devgan – Gangaajal as SP Amit Kumar ‡
 Amitabh Bachchan – Khakee as DCP Anant Kumar Shrivastav ‡
 Sanjay Dutt – Munna Bhai M.B.B.S. as Murli Prasad Sharma aka Munna Bhai
 Shahrukh Khan – Kal Ho Naa Ho as Aman Mathur ‡
 2005 – No award
 2006 Amitabh Bachchan – Black as Debraj Sahai †
 Akshay Kumar – Waqt: The Race Against Time as Aditya Thakur
 Anil Kapoor – No Entry as Kishen
 Saif Ali Khan – Parineeta as Shekhar Rai ‡
 Shahrukh Khan – Swades: We, the People as Mohan Bhargava †
 2007 – No award
 2008 Shahrukh Khan – Chak De! India as Kabir Khan †
 Abhishek Bachchan – Guru as Gurukant Desai ‡
 Akshaye Khanna – Gandhi, My Father as Harilal Gandhi
 Amitabh Bachchan – Cheeni Kum as Buddhadev Gupta
 Shahid Kapoor – Jab We Met as Aditya Kashyap ‡
 2009 Hrithik Roshan – Jodhaa Akbar as Jalaluddin Mohammad Akbar †
 Abhishek Bachchan – Dostana as Sameer "Sam" Acharya ‡
 Akshay Kumar – Singh Is Kinng as Happy Singh ‡
 Darsheel Safary – Taare Zameen Par as Ishaan Nandkishore Awasthi ‡
 Naseeruddin Shah – A Wednesday! as Anonymous antagonist ‡

2010s

 2010 Shahrukh Khan – Rab Ne Bana Di Jodi as Surinder "Suri" Sahni/Raj Kapoor ‡
 Aamir Khan – Ghajini as Sanjay Singhania 
 Ranbir Kapoor – Wake Up Sid as Sidharth "Sid" Mehra ‡
 Saif Ali Khan – Love Aaj Kal as Jai Vardhan Singh/Veer Singh ‡
 Shahid Kapoor – Kaminey as Charlie Sharma/Guddu Sharma ‡
 2011 Salman Khan – Dabangg as Chulbul Pandey ‡
 Ajay Devgan – Once Upon a Time in Mumbaai as Sultan Mirza ‡
 Hrithik Roshan – Guzaarish as Ethan Mascarenhas ‡
 Ranbir Kapoor – Raajneeti as Samar Pratap ‡
 Shahrukh Khan – My Name Is Khan as Rizwan Khan †
 2012 Ranbir Kapoor – Rockstar as Janardan Jhakhar / Jordan †
 Ajay Devgan – Singham as Bajirao Singham ‡
 Emraan Hashmi – Murder 2 as Arjun Bhagawat
 Salman Khan – Bodyguard as Lovely Singh ‡
 Shahrukh Khan – Don 2 as Don ‡
 2013 Ranbir Kapoor – Barfi! as Murphy "Barfi" Johnson †
 Ayushmann Khurrana – Vicky Donor as Vicky Arora
 Hrithik Roshan – Agneepath as Vijay Deenanath Chauhan ‡
 Irrfan Khan – Paan Singh Tomar as Paan Singh Tomar ‡
 Manoj Bajpai – Gangs of Wasseypur as Sardar Khan ‡
 Shahrukh Khan – Jab Tak Hai Jaan as Samar Anand ‡
 2014 Farhan Akhtar – Bhaag Milkha Bhaag as Milkha Singh †
 Irrfan Khan – The Lunchbox as Saajan Fernandez
 Rajkummar Rao – Shahid as Shahid Azmi
 Ranbir Kapoor – Yeh Jawaani Hai Deewani as Kabir "Bunny" Thapar ‡
 Ranveer Singh – Goliyon Ki Raasleela Ram-Leela as Ram Rajari ‡
 Sushant Singh Rajput – Kai Po Che! as Ishaan Bhatt
 2015 Shahid Kapoor - Haider as Haider Meer
2016 Ranveer Singh - Bajirao Mastani as Peshwa Bajirao

See also
Producers Guild Film Awards
Producers Guild Film Award for Best Actress in a Leading Role

References

Producers Guild Film Awards